"Hail, Columbia" is an American patriotic song and ceremonial entrance march of the vice president of the United States. It was originally considered to be one of the unofficial national anthems of the United States until 1931, when "The Star-Spangled Banner" was named as the official national anthem. Columbia is the name for the national personification of the United States which originated during the 18th century.

History
The music was composed by Philip Phile in 1789 for the first inauguration of George Washington and titled "The President's March". It became the song "Hail, Columbia" when arranged with lyrics by Joseph Hopkinson in 1798. The song gained popularity during the XYZ Affair and subsequent Quasi-War with France. The song was used in the United States as a de facto national anthem throughout the 19th century. However, the song lost popularity after World War I until it was replaced by "The Star-Spangled Banner" in 1931.

It was the personal anthem for the president, until it was replaced by the song "Hail to the Chief", and it is now the official vice president's personal anthem. The song is always preceded by four ruffles and flourishes when introducing the vice president. It has also been used as a slow march during military ceremonies, often while the band countermarches.

Lyrics

See also

 "Hail, America"
 United States military music customs

References

Further reading 
   The current version of the Army's protocol.

External links

 MIDI of piano performance of "Hail, Columbia"—Kids Pages, National Institute of Environmental Health Sciences
 Sheet music for "Hail, Columbia" from Project Gutenberg
 Score and Arrangements from IMSLP

18th-century songs
American patriotic songs
Historical national anthems
North American anthems
Vice presidency of the United States